America is a sculpture created in 2016 by the Italian artist Maurizio Cattelan. An example of satirical participatory art, it is a fully functioning toilet made of 18-karat solid gold. It was stolen in 2019 from Blenheim Palace, where it was exhibited on loan from the permanent collection of the Solomon R. Guggenheim Museum.

Exhibitions

Solomon R. Guggenheim Museum
Cattelan created the toilet in 2016 for the Solomon R. Guggenheim Museum in New York City. It was made in a foundry in Florence, cast in several parts that were welded together.  Made to look like the museum's other Kohler toilets, it was installed in one of the museum's bathrooms for visitors to use. A special cleaning routine was put in place. The museum stated that the work was paid for with private funds.

According to the museum, over 100,000 people waited in line to use America, and a security guard was posted outside the bathroom. As an artwork, it has been estimated as high as six million.

In September 2017, when the museum declined a White House request to loan its 1888 Van Gogh painting Landscape with Snow for then President Donald Trump's private rooms, curator Nancy Spector offered to loan America instead. Any reply by the White House was not reported.

Blenheim Palace
In September 2019, America was installed at Blenheim Palace in the United Kingdom, where it was available for use as part of an exhibition of Cattelan's works. It was placed in a water closet formerly used by Winston Churchill. 

On 14 September, the sculpture was stolen. A representative of Blenheim had earlier commented that because America was plumbed in, and potential thieves would be aware of its use, security was not much of an issue. Because it had been connected to the building's water pipes, the theft caused structural damage and flooding to the World Heritage Site. Two men were arrested and released in connection with the incident. Cattelan commented: "I always liked heist movies and finally I'm in one of them."

Blenheim's insurance company has stated that up to approximately $124,000 can be paid in reward for the return of the toilet. In mid-October, three new arrests were made in connection to the theft. By November, the total number of arrests was six, all of whom have been released without charge. Speculation about the fate of the toilet includes it being melted down, that it has been hidden fairly close to Blenheim and that the theft is a prank by Cattelan. Local imitations of the work have been made, including one that was itself stolen.

Interpretation
The Guggenheim museum linked the meaning of the sculpture to the career of Donald Trump, writing in September 2016 that "the aesthetics of this 'throne' recall nothing so much as the gilded excess of Trump's real-estate ventures and private residences". Cattelan himself declined to give an interpretation of his work, which he conceived of before Trump's presidential candidacy. He said that the connection to Trump is "another layer, but it shouldn’t be the only one."

The work has also been described as an interpretation of Marcel Duchamp's 1917 sculpture Fountain. Art critic Jonathan Jones, using the work at Blenheim Palace, opined that it felt "Much like peeing on porcelain. But here, among all the photos of young Winston, it also feels like pissing on British history." He also found the sculpture reminiscent of then prime minister Boris Johnson's hair.

Other gold toilets
In 2002 Winger Lam Sai-wing, a Hong Kong businessman, included two gold toilets in what he called a shrine to Lenin. He referred to a comment by Lenin about the use of gold after the victory of socialism.

In 2019 the Hong Kong jewellery firm Coronet displayed a gold toilet in Shanghai. This toilet had a bulletproof seat containing  more than 40,000 small diamonds.

Cattelan said that he made three gold toilets.

See also
List of heists in the United Kingdom

References

Notes

External links
 Maurizio Cattelan: “America” at guggenheim.org

2016 sculptures
Gold sculptures in the United States
Lost sculptures
Sculptures in New York City
Sculptures in the United Kingdom
Stolen works of art
Toilets
Works about Donald Trump
Works by Italian people
Donald Trump in popular culture
Robberies in the United Kingdom